Setoishi Dam  is a gravity dam located in Kumamoto Prefecture in Japan. The dam is used for power production. The catchment area of the dam is 1629.3 km2. The dam impounds about 124  ha of land when full and can store 9930 thousand cubic meters of water. The construction of the dam was started on 1956 and completed in 1958.

See also
List of dams in Japan

References

Dams in Kumamoto Prefecture